The House of Poniatowski (plural: Poniatowscy) is a prominent Polish family that was part of the nobility of Poland. A member of this family, Stanisław Poniatowski, was elected as King of Poland and reigned from 1764 until his abdication in 1795. Since Polish adjectives have different forms for the genders, Poniatowska is the equivalent name for a female member of this family.

History
The Poniatowski family became most prominent in the late 18th century and 19th century. In three generations, the family rose from the rank of gentry to that of senator and then to royalty (in an elective monarchy).

The first information about the family dates back to the end of the 15th century, when they appeared in Poniatowa, 40 km west from Lublin in about 1446. Their family name derives from that place name. Poniatowa was the residence of several branches of the Poniatowski family: Tłuk, Jarasz and Ciołek.

According to the family's history, the family had ties with the Italian nobility: Giuseppe Salinguerra, a member of the Italian family of Torelli, settled in Poland about the middle of the 17th century, and there assumed the name of Poniatowski from the estate of Poniatow, belonging to his wife, who was the daughter of Albert Poniatowski and Anna Leszczyńska.

On 7 September 1764, at Wola, the most famous member of the family, Stanisław Poniatowski, was elected as King of Poland and Grand Duke of Lithuania. In the same year, the Coronation Sejm awarded the Poniatowski family the title of Prince of Poland.

Nowadays, there are still Poniatowscy living in Poland, France, Mexico, Italy, Russia, the United States, Germany, and many other countries in the world.

Members

Among most known members are:
 Stanisław Poniatowski (1676–1762), Podstoli, Treasurer, General, Regimentarz
 Kazimierz Poniatowski (1721–1800), General, Great Podkomorzy
 Ludwika Maria Poniatowska (1728–1781), was married to Jan Jakub Zamoyski
 Izabella Poniatowska (1730–1801), was married to Jan Klemens Branicki
 Stanisław August Poniatowski (1732–1798), King of Poland, reigned as Stanisław II August
 Andrzej Poniatowski (1735–1773), General, Marshal of Austria
 Michał Jerzy Poniatowski (1736–1794), Primate of Poland
 Konstancja Poniatowska (1759–1830), was married to Ludwik Tyszkiewicz 
 Józef Poniatowski (1763–1813), General, Marshal of France
 Stanisław Poniatowski (1754–1833), Duke, Grand Treasurer
 Jozef Michal Poniatowski (1814–1873), Tuscan plenipotentiary, French senator, composer and singer
 Józef Stanisław Poniatowski (1835–1908), Polish nobleman, son of Jozef Michal
 André Poniatowski (1864–1954), was a Polish nobleman, financier and industrialist, son of Józef Stanisław
 Michel Poniatowski (1922–2002), French politician
 Elena Poniatowska (1932-), Mexican journalist and author

Coat of arms
The Poniatowski family used the Ciołek arms.

Palaces

Family tree

See also
 Thursday Dinners
 No. 304 Polish Bomber Squadron im. Ks. Józefa Poniatowskiego"

Notes

External links

 Stanisław August Antoni Poniatowski h. Ciołek
 http://pl.rodovid.org/wk/Specjalna:Tree/46352